Todoran is a Romanian surname. Notable people with the surname include:

Dinu Todoran (born 1978), Romanian football player and manager
Paula Todoran (born 1985), Romanian long-distance runner

Romanian-language surnames